Hazama Station is the name of two train stations in Japan:

 Hazama Station (Kagawa) (羽間駅)
 Hazama Station (Tokyo) (狭間駅)